Saccharibacillus qingshengii is a Gram-positive, rod-shaped and strictly aerobic bacteria from the genus of Saccharibacillus which has been isolated from soil from a lead-cadmium tailing from Qixia District in China.

References

External links
Type strain of Saccharibacillus qingshengii at BacDive -  the Bacterial Diversity Metadatabase

Paenibacillaceae
Bacteria described in 2016